The N2 road is one of the national highways of the Republic of the Congo. It is a south–north highway which connects the capital of Brazzaville with the northern border.

While this is marked as a tarmac road on most modern maps including the current Michelin series it has not existed as a navigable route for some decades. As of 2002 none of the major bridges on this route were passable, and satellite imagery confirms that little of this 'ghost' road actually exists on the ground.

Roads in the Republic of the Congo